Vajradhatu was the name of the umbrella organization of Chögyam Trungpa Rinpoche, one of the first Tibetan Buddhist lamas to visit and teach in the West. It served as the vehicle for the promulgation of his Buddhist teachings, and was also the name by which his community was known from 1973 until 1990.  Starting in 1976 it was paralleled by a governmental structure for establishing the non-denominational enlightened society of Shambhala Kingdom, which included Shambhala Training among many other activities. Eventually, the Vajradhatu organization was renamed Shambhala International by Sakyong Mipham Rinpoche.

History
The community of Chögyam Trungpa originated in 1970 with his arrival in North America from Scotland. The first established center of his teachings was "Tail of the Tiger" in Barnet, Vermont (now Karmê Chöling). When he began teaching at University of Colorado Boulder in 1971, a second branch of the community began to form there. When Vajradhatu was incorporated in Colorado in 1973, it consolidated Tail of the Tiger, Rocky Mountain Dharma Center, a retreat facility in the Rocky Mountains in Colorado; and Karma Dzong, an urban meditation center in Boulder. The organization grew to include Gampo Abbey in Nova Scotia and dozens of smaller meditation centers called Dharmadhatus in cities around the US, Canada and later in Europe.

In the early 1970s the community grew rapidly and attracted the involvement of such notables as Allen Ginsberg, Anne Waldman, and many others. As the decade wore on, the hippies and sixties counterculture members who comprised the large part of the membership were asked by Trungpa to experiment with more formal modes of behavior, attire, address, and societal expressions in general.

Vajradhatu hosted visits by Rangjung Rigpe Dorje, 16th Karmapa, head of the Kagyu, in 1974, Khyentse Norbu, head of the Nyingma, in 1976, and the 14th Dalai Lama in 1981. In 1976 Trungpa Rinpoche began his cycle of Shambhala teachings and, with his students, manifesting forms of Shambhala society.  In 1986 he moved the international headquarters of Vajradhatu to Halifax, Nova Scotia, where he died the following year. A large number of his disciples emigrated from the United States to Nova Scotia along with him.

In 1972 Trungpa had identified Thomas F. Rich, an American with Buddhist name Ösel Tendzin, as his dharma heir, and in a formal ceremony on August 22, 1976, Trungpa appointed Rich as Dorje Gyaltsap, Vajra Regent and Director of the First Class of Vajradhatu. As described in the 1977 article in "Garuda V", which also reproduces the proclamation (signed by Trungpa XI and the 16th Karmapa, Trungpa empowered Thomas Rich "as his regent and as a holder of the Kagyu and Nyingma lineages". Trungpa further stated "There is the possibility that members of the sangha, Western people, can take over from the Tibetans".

Following Trungpa's death, senior Kagyu lineage holder Tai Situpa recommended that he himself take over leadership of Vajradhatu in conjunction with Trungpa's half brother, Damchu Tenphel, who resided in Tibet.

Tendzin declined the offer, and assumed leadership of the organization until his own death shortly thereafter in 1990 of HIV/AIDS, amid controversy over admissions that he had unprotected sex with students while knowing he was HIV+. Ösel Tendzin infected at least one male student with HIV; the young man later died of AIDS.

Transition to Shambhala International
After the death of Ösel Tendzin, Ösel Rangdröl Mukpo (Trungpa's eldest son, then known as "the Sawang," now Sakyong Mipham) became the new spiritual head. The community had been deeply divided and in distress over the events surrounding Ösel Tendzin's death, and repeatedly turned to the elder statesmen of the Kagyu and Nyingma lineages for guidance. The succession of Ösel Rangdröl was approved by the heads of both the Kagyu and Nyingma lineages, who encouraged the community to persevere. Jamgön Kongtrül the third, one of the four regents of the Karma Kagyu lineage in the period when the Karmapa had yet to be recognized, issued a statement that "His Holiness [Dilgo Khenstse Rinpoche, head of the Nyingma lineage and the Sawang's teacher] and the Kagyu lineage holders are all in agreement that the Sawang Ösel Rangdröl Mukpo should become the lineage holder of Vajradhatu.".

In February 2000, restated articles of incorporation were signed, officially changing the name from Vajradhatu to Shambhala International. The change of name, which began informally with the Sakyong Mipham's assumption of leadership in 1990, reflected his approach of integrating the Shambhala teachings within Buddhism and making them the unifying principle of a Shambhala Buddhist sangha.  This transition enabled the organization to avoid lawsuits and consequent financial ruin.

Notes

References
 Butterfield, Stephen T. (1994). The Double Mirror: A Skeptical Journey into Buddhist Tantra. 
 Dart, John (1989) "Buddhist Sect Alarmed by Reports that Leader Kept his AIDS a Secret", The Los Angeles Times, March 3, 1989 link
Eldershaw, Lynn P. "Collective identity and the post-charismatic fate of Shambhala International" 2004 Ph. D. thesis; also, an article drawn from this thesis was published in Nova Religio: The Journal of Alternative and Emergent Religions, (2007) Vol. 10 No. 4, pp. 72–102,

External links
 Chronicles Radio:Ken Green How Chogyam Trungpa created Vajradhatu and Shambhala society and government
 The Chronicle Project:TCS Record of official correspondence between Vajradhatu and Tibetan Buddhist lineage holders ca 1990
 Karmê Chöling The first Vajradhatu practice center (Vermont)
 Karma Dzong The first major urban practice center (Colorado)

Buddhism in the United States
Shambhala vision
Religious organizations established in 1973
Religious organizations disestablished in 2000
Buddhist organizations